Shen Longyuan (born 2 March 1985 in Yangpu, Shanghai) is a Chinese football player who currently plays for Chinese club Rizhao Yuqi.

Club career
Shen Longyuan started his professional football career in 2004 after he graduated from the Shanghai Shenhua youth team. He would make his league debut for Shenhua against Qingdao Zhongneng on October 23, 2004, coming on as a late substitute in a 1–0 defeat. After that defeat he would only play in one more league game throughout the season, however he would continue to establish himself the following seasons as a reliable squad regular within the team. By the 2006 league season he would gain more playing time and on September 9, 2006, Shen would go on to score his first league goal against Beijing Guoan in a 1–0 victory. With the introduction of Jia Xiuquan as manager during the 2008 league season Shen would actually start to become a permanent member of the first team, however this was out of position at full back during the absence of Sun Xiang. When Miroslav Blažević came in as manager at the beginning of the 2010 league season he stopped playing Shen out of position but ignored him throughout most of the season and rarely played him at all.

After his contract expired at the end of the 2010 league season he would leave Shanghai Shenhua and subsequently join Hangzhou Greentown in January 2011 where he was reunited with one of his former Shenhua managers Wu Jingui. On March 1, 2011, in Hangzhou's first game of the season Shen would make his debut against Nagoya Grampus in a 2011 AFC Champions League group stage game, Which Hangzhou won 2–0.

Shen transferred to China League One newcomer Chongqing F.C. in February 2012. He became an unattached player at the end of 2013 season after Chongqing dissolved. He was linked with Super League club Tianjin TEDA. Shen moved to China League Two side Fujian Broncos in August 2014. However, he failed to register to play for Fujian Broncos. On 14 March 2016, Shen joined League Two club Shanghai JuJu Sports after settling his contract dispute with amateur club Shanghai Jiading Boo King.

International career
He was a regular starter for the China Olympic (U-23) football team for several seasons. He subsequently was part of the Football at the 2008 Summer Olympics – Men's tournament squad where he played in the last group game coming on as a substitute for Hao Junmin.

Shen Longyuan made his international debut against Thailand national football team in a 3-3 friendly draw where he came on as a 46-minute substitute for Wang Dong.

Career statistics

References

External links

Player Profile at Shanghai Shenhua website
Player stats at sohu.com

1985 births
Living people
Association football midfielders
Chinese footballers
Footballers from Shanghai
China international footballers
Footballers at the 2008 Summer Olympics
Olympic footballers of China
Shanghai Shenhua F.C. players
Zhejiang Professional F.C. players
Taizhou Yuanda F.C. players
Chinese Super League players
China League One players
China League Two players
Footballers at the 2006 Asian Games
Asian Games competitors for China